Fai chun or chunlian  is a traditional decoration that is frequently used during Chinese New Year. People put fai chun in the doorways to create a jubilant festive atmosphere since the phrases written on it means good luck and prosperity. Customarily, fai chun is written by hand but owing to convenience, printed versions are mass-produced nowadays. fai chun is in either square or rectangular shape. Not only does it exist in Greater China but also in Korea, Japan, and Vietnam.

History
Fai chun originated from taofu (桃符; peach wood charms) in ancient times. Peachwood charms are long pieces of wood hung from peach trees. They are about seven to eight inches long and slightly more than one inch wide. According to the legend, there was a peach tree in the East China Sea that was the gate where the ghosts passed through between the underworld and the world of the living. Two gods, Shentu and Yulei, were responsible for guarding this gate. The ghosts traveling the world at night time were required to return to the underworld before the early morning. It was believed that the two gods could dispel all the demons which did harm to human at night time. People, therefore, used the peach wood to make two puppets of the two gods and put them at the entrance of their home in order to protect their family. Then, as early as the Han dynasty, people found that it was hard and complicated to make puppets, so they simplified the puppets to two peach wood boards on which they drew portraits of the gods. Later on, people simply wrote down the names of the gods on pieces of peach wood and hung them on both sides of the door. Around the Tang dynasty, commoners no longer wrote the names of the gods only but add some blessings to symbolize good fortune as well as express their hope and best wishes in the new year. Since Ming dynasty, pieces of peach wood were replaced by square red papers.

There is another story which is related to Fai Chun history. According to the legend, there was a monster who lived in the deep sea and had a lion-like head and an ox-like body, who was named ''Nian'' (年).  Around New Year, it scared the villagers by eating their crops, livestock and even the villagers themselves.

One time, during a rampage, Nian was seen running away from a house which had a red shirt hanging outside and then later, from a light. Consequently, the villagers discovered that the monster was afraid of red color, loud noise and flaming light. Since then, before every New Year, people paste red couplets in and outside their house, and let off firecrackers and fireworks, in order to scare the monster away.

After Nian went back to the sea, people would come out and celebrate the New Year. This became a tradition every year, with people keep pasting red couplets every year, which is called Fai Chun now.

Colour
Traditional fai chun is in bright red color with black or gold characters inscribed on it with a brush. Similar to the color of fire, red color was chosen to scare the legendary fierce and barbarous beast “Nian”, which ate up villagers’ crops, livestock and even villagers themselves on the eve of the new year.

Forms of fai chun
In the past, fai chun was presented in Xuan paper. Its fine and soft texture enables vivid and dynamic artistic expression of Chinese calligraphy. In this age of technology, city dwellers seldom write their own fai chun. Instead, they purchase them in stationery stores or shopping malls where a wide diversity of styles is offered.
Thanks to the advancement in technology, fai chun can be printed in multiple colors. Commercialization of fai chun can be seen when animated characters are used to attract children while sparkling decorations are used to attract adults. Moreover, the material of fai chun is no more limited to mere paper. Fai chun made by cloth, plastic and layers of cardboard are quite common. Nevertheless, the practice of writing fai chun continues in traditional areas, particularly in walled villages.

Types of fai chun
The types of fai chun are as follows:

Doufang
Doufang (斗方) is a square that its angles point to four cardinal points. Owing to the limited space, this type of fai chun only displays one character such as “Chun” (春; Spring), “Man” (滿; Full) and “Fu” (福; Good fortune). “Man” is stuck on rice bins of refrigerators hoping for abundant food. “Fu”  is always hung inverted on the center of the door on purpose. The reason behind this is the superstition that the homonymy of the Mandarin words “inverted” (倒) and “arrival” (到) suggests the arrival of happiness and good fortune. Combined words, a non-existent word that encompasses parts of Chinese characters, is also very common.

Chuntiao
Chuntiao (春條) or is a vertical or horizontal rectangle that carries two or four Chinese characters. Auspicious phases are expressed based on various contexts. For example, “Gōngxǐ fācái” 恭喜發財 is an ubiquitous phrase that wishes people to become affluent so it can be seen in all occasions. Regarding workplace, “Cáiyuán gǔngǔn” (財源滾滾; Merchandise will turn like a wheel) is a term that suggest prosperity. At home, “niánnián yǒuyú” (年年有餘; Surplus year-after-year) are deemed to wish for excess family possessions in the end of the year. Children usually paste “Xuéyè jìnbù” (學業進步; Progress in studies) on their bedroom doors hoping for higher form position in the coming academic year while the elderly hang “Lóng mǎ jīngshén” (龍馬精神; Spirits of dragon and horse), which is conceived to be able to shelter them from diseases.

Chunlian (Spring couplets)
Chunlian (春聯) is a duilian, typically seven characters, on two sides of the door frame, whose content is related to the Chinese New Year. Lexical and tonal rules are always adhered, though not strictly, as chunlian is transformed from metrical poems. Sometimes, concurrently, a horizontal scroll with four to five characters is hung on the crosspiece of the door. Its content expresses the wishes of the homeowner for the upcoming year.   Besides being hung on door frames, chunlian are necessary items that are unfurled at the end of a dragon dance.

References

Chinese New Year
Chinese calligraphy